Dilipkumar Mansukhlal Gandhi (9 May 1951 – 17 March 2021) was an Indian politician and a member of the Bharatiya Janata Party (BJP) political party. He was the member of the 16th Lok Sabha of India. He died on 17 March 2021, from COVID-19.

Political career
Gandhi began his political career by holding key positions in the district organisation of BJP such as General Secretary, Joint Secretary and President. He was elected to the Ahmednagar Municipal Corporation as a Councilor and later he became the Leader of the Bharatiya Janata Party in the Municipal Council. In 1985, he became the Vice-President of the Ahmednagar Municipal Corporation.

In 1999 he was elected to the 13th Lok Sabha from Ahmednagar constituency in Maharashtra state. He was Union Minister of State, Ministry of Shipping from 29 January 2003 to 15 March 2004.

In 2009, he was elected to the 15th Lok Sabha from the same constituency.

In 2014, he was re-elected with a margin of more than 200,000 votes in 2014 Indian general elections in which BJP had a huge victory across India under leadership of Narendra Modi as PM Candidate.

See also
 All India Marwari Yuva Manch
 Utkal Prantiya Marwari Yuva Manch

References

|-

|-

External links
 Detailed Profile: Shri Dilip Kumar Mansukhlal Gandhi
 Official biographical sketch in the Parliament of India website
 Odisha Tourism

1951 births
2021 deaths
Marwari people
Bharatiya Janata Party politicians from Maharashtra
People from Maharashtra
India MPs 2014–2019
India MPs 1999–2004
Marathi politicians
People from Ahmednagar
People from Pune district
Lok Sabha members from Maharashtra
Maharashtra municipal councillors
India MPs 2009–2014
Deaths from the COVID-19 pandemic in India